Straubing is an electoral constituency (German: Wahlkreis) represented in the Bundestag. It elects one member via first-past-the-post voting. Under the current constituency numbering system, it is designated as constituency 231. It is located in southeastern Bavaria, comprising the city of Straubing and the districts of Regen and Straubing-Bogen.

Straubing was created for the inaugural 1949 federal election. Since 2013, it has been represented by Alois Rainer of the Christian Social Union (CSU).

Geography
Straubing is located in southeastern Bavaria. As of the 2021 federal election, it comprises the independent city of Straubing and the districts of Regen and Straubing-Bogen.

History
Straubing was created in 1949. In the 1949 election, it was Bavaria constituency 17 in the numbering system. In the 1953 through 1961 elections, it was number 212. In the 1965 through 1972 elections, it was number 216. In the 1976 through 1998 elections, it was number 217. In the 2002 and 2005 elections, it was number 232. Since the 2009 election, it has been number 231.

Originally, the constituency comprised the independent city of Straubing and the districts of Landkreis Straubing, Bogen, Dingolfing, and Mallersdorf. In the 1965 through 1972 elections, it also contained the district of Landau an der Isar. It acquired its current borders in the 1976 election.

Members
The constituency has been held by the Christian Social Union (CSU) during all but one Bundestag term since its creation. It was first represented by Johann Wartner of the Bavaria Party (BP) from 1949 to 1953. Josef Lermer of the CSU won it in 1953 and served until 1965. Alois Rainer (born 1921) was then representative from 1965 to 1983. Ernst Hinsken then served from 1983 to 2013, a total of eight consecutive terms. Alois Georg Rainer, son of former representative Alois Rainer, was elected in 2013, and re-elected in 2017 and 2021.

Election results

2021 election

2017 election

2013 election

2009 election

References

Federal electoral districts in Bavaria
1949 establishments in West Germany
Constituencies established in 1949
Straubing
Regen (district)
Straubing-Bogen